Aso Sport Club is an Iraqi football team based in Erbil, that plays in Iraq Division Three and Kurdistan Premier League.

Aso played in the Iraq Division One in the 2004-05 season.

Managerial history
  Kameran Jabbar
  Sarmand Aziz
  Amanj Mahmoud

See also 
 2001–02 Iraq FA Cup
 2002–03 Iraq FA Cup

References

External links
 Aso SC on Goalzz.com
 Iraq Clubs- Foundation Dates

1994 establishments in Iraq
Association football clubs established in 1994
Football clubs in Erbil